The Nettleton–Mead House is a historic house in Greeley, Colorado. It is listed on the National Register of Historic Places.

History
The house was built in 1872 for Edwin S. Nettleton, a member of the Union Colony of Colorado who designed canals. When Nettleton died in 1901, the house was acquired by Alexander Mead. His daughter, Ella Mead, was a female physician who "established one of the first birth control clinics" in the United States in 1920.

Architectural significance
The house was designed in the Italianate architectural style. It has been listed on the National Register of Historic Places since April 2, 2002.

References

Houses on the National Register of Historic Places in Colorado
National Register of Historic Places in Weld County, Colorado
Italianate architecture in Colorado
Houses completed in 1872